Allen Cunningham (born March 28, 1977) is an American professional poker player who has won five World Series of Poker bracelets.

Career
Cunningham studied civil engineering at UCLA before dropping out of school to play poker professionally.  At the age of 18, he began playing at Indian casinos. Previously a Full Tilt sponsored pro, he became a full member of Team Full Tilt in October 2006.

Cunningham earned the title 2005 ESPN/Toyota Player of the Year and came close to winning it again in 2006.  He was also voted by fellow professional poker players the Best All Around Player under 35.

Cunningham's single largest tournament payout occurred at the 2006 World Series of Poker when he finished in fourth place in the Main Event, earning $3,628,513. Frequently during the tournament, when other players tried to take on Cunningham, ESPN's Norman Chad would respond with comments such as: "What are they thinking of? It's Allen Cunningham!"

Cunningham joined a short list of players who have won a World Series of Poker Bracelet in three consecutive years after winning his fifth bracelet in 2007.  Others to accomplish this include Johnny Moss, Bill Boyd, Doyle Brunson, Gary Berland and Erik Seidel.

Cunningham won the $300,000 'Mega Match' on Poker After Dark that aired the week of October 8, 2007. On December 7, 2007, Cunningham won the $15,000 buy-in inaugural National Poker League Vegas Open Championship Main Event after defeating David Singer during heads-up play, winning over $325,000.

On May 1, 2008, Cunningham won the 2008 World Series of Poker Circuit event at Caesars Palace, Las Vegas, earning $499,162. In the 2008 World Series of Poker Cunningham made another deep run in the Main Event, finishing 117th place out of 6844 players, earning $41,816.

As of 2023, his total live tournament winnings exceed $11,900,000, 90th on the all time winnings list. As of March 2023, his 84 cashes including his five bracelets have netted him $7,988,439 in WSOP earnings.

He resides in Las Vegas with girlfriend Melissa Hayden and their dog.

Awards
ALL IN Magazine 2006 Poker Player of the Year

Notes

External links 

 
PokerListings.com interview

1977 births
Living people
American poker players
World Series of Poker bracelet winners
WSOP Player of the Year Award winners
World Series of Poker Circuit event winners
Poker After Dark tournament winners
People from Riverside, California